David Wall is an American actor who wrote, produced, and directed a 2007 dramedy film called Noëlle, which won the Best Director Award at the Fort Lauderdale International Film Festival. He wrote, co-produced and directed Joe & Joe, shot by Kramer Morgenthau on Cape Cod in Massachusetts, and was selected for the 1996 Sundance Film Festival. He was the main actor of Shades of Truth (2015), a film directed by Liana Marabini and produced by Condor Pictures, playing the role of David.

External links

Year of birth missing (living people)
Living people
American male film actors
American male television actors
People from Hesperia, California
People from San Bernardino County, California
Film directors from California
Male actors from California